The Palmetto Promise Institute (PPI) is a conservative think tank in South Carolina. The organization was formerly named the Palmetto Fort Foundation and the Palmetto Policy Forum.

Overview
The organization was founded as the Palmetto Fort Foundation in 2009 in honor of the Battle of Fort Moultrie. It was relaunched by Jim DeMint in 2013 with $300,000 of his leftover campaign money. Its president and chief executive officer is Ellen Weaver. 

The organization's board of directors includes Rick Timmons, Jim DeMint, Dan Adams, Mike Brenan, Stu Rodman, Van Hipp Jr., Phil Hughes, Wendy Damron, and Barry Wynn.

The think tank was named as a co-defendant, along with Governor Henry McMaster and others, in the South Carolina Supreme Court case Adams v McMaster. The lawsuit stemmed from McMaster's plan to spend $32 million in federal coronavirus aid to help families pay for K-12 private school tuition. In the case, the court ruled that McMaster's SAFE Grants, which were promoted publicly by the Palmetto Promise Institute, were a violation of the state constitution's prohibition against state funds being used to fund private schools.

Palmetto Promise Institute is part of the conservative and libertarian State Policy Network.

References

External links

 
 Organizational Profile – National Center for Charitable Statistics (Urban Institute)

Political and economic think tanks in the United States
Conservative organizations in the United States